Nymph is a 1973 sexploitation film directed by William Dear, in his feature film directorial debut.

Plot
Tommy Harris and his girlfriend C.J. travel to Northern Michigan to find his father Carl, a World War II veteran on a deer hunting trip with his friends.

Cast
 Peggy Kramer as C.J.
 Burton Dunning as Tommy Harris
 Jack Donachie as Carl Harris
 Bob Charlton as Pat Armistead
 Henry A. Houston as Bob Neely
 Ed Oldani as Dick
 Jim Marsh as Ed
 Russ Blanchard as Len
 John Garrett as Mac

References

External links

1973 directorial debut films
1973 films
1970s American films
1970s English-language films
American drama films
American sexploitation films
Films directed by William Dear
Films set in Michigan